Mieko Ogawa (born 13 February 1949) is a Japanese luger. She competed in the women's singles event at the 1976 Winter Olympics.

References

1949 births
Living people
Japanese female lugers
Olympic lugers of Japan
Lugers at the 1976 Winter Olympics
Sportspeople from Hokkaido